Hadad was the storm and rain god in the Northwest Semitic and ancient Mesopotamian religions.

Hadad or Haddad may also refer to:

 Haddad or Hadad, an ancient Middle Eastern family name originating in Aramaic
 Hadad (Bible), the name of several biblical characters
 Hadad (son of Bedad), an early king of Edom
 Hadad the Edomite
 Hodod (Hungarian: Hadad), a commune in Romania

See also 
 
 
 Hadadezer
 Ben-hadad (disambiguation)